Serena Williams was the two-time defending champion, but withdrew before her quarterfinal match because of a left thigh injury.

Maria Sharapova, runner-up in 2013, claimed the title by beating Simona Halep in three sets in the final, 1–6, 6–2, 6–3.

Seeds

 Serena Williams (quarterfinals, withdrew because of a left thigh injury)
 Li Na (quarterfinals)
 Agnieszka Radwańska (semifinals)
 Simona Halep (final)
 Petra Kvitová (semifinals)
 Jelena Janković (second round)
 Angelique Kerber (first round, retired because of a lower back injury)
 Maria Sharapova (champion)
 Dominika Cibulková (first round)
 Sara Errani (third round)
 Ana Ivanovic (quarterfinals)
 Flavia Pennetta (first round)
 Caroline Wozniacki (second round)
 Carla Suárez Navarro (third round)
 Sabine Lisicki (third round)
 Sloane Stephens (third round)

Draw

Finals

Top half

Section 1

Section 2

Bottom half

Section 3

Section 4

Qualifying

Seeds

  Caroline Garcia (qualified)
  Jana Čepelová (qualifying competition)
  Camila Giorgi (qualifying competition)
  Monica Puig (first round)
  Vania King (first round)
  Karolína Plíšková (qualified)
  Yaroslava Shvedova (first round)
  Donna Vekić (qualifying competition)
  Paula Ormaechea (first round)
  Urszula Radwańska (first round)
  Alexandra Cadanțu (first round, retired)
  Virginie Razzano (first round)
  Ajla Tomljanović (first round)
  Patricia Mayr-Achleitner (qualifying competition, retired)
  Monica Niculescu (qualified)
  Chanelle Scheepers (first round)

Qualifiers

  Caroline Garcia
  Monica Niculescu
  Belinda Bencic
  Petra Cetkovská
  Julia Görges
  Karolína Plíšková
  Mariana Duque Mariño
  Kristina Mladenovic

Draw

First qualifier

Second qualifier

Third qualifier

Fourth qualifier

Fifth qualifier

Sixth qualifier

Seventh qualifier

Eighth qualifier

References

External links
 Main Draw
 Qualifying Draw

Mutua Madrid Openandnbsp;- Women's Singles
Women's singles